The 1972 Nevada Wolf Pack football team represented the University of Nevada, Reno during the 1972 NCAA College Division football season. Nevada competed as an independent. The Wolf Pack were led by fourth-year head coach Jerry Scattini and played their home games at Mackay Stadium.

Schedule

References

Nevada
Nevada Wolf Pack football seasons
Nevada Wolf Pack football